Salvia × superba is a widely grown Salvia hybrid. Its origins are unknown, though it first appeared in cultivation, and its parents are  believed to include Salvia × sylvestris and Salvia amplexicaulis. Salvia nemorosa has also been suggested as a direct parent or close relative, but with so many similarities between these species and hybrids, there is no conclusive evidence. It is often mistakenly called Salvia superba.

The flowers grow in whorls that are a bit more separated than in their parents. Selected cultivars  include the confusingly named 'Superba', and 'Rubin'. The cultivar 'Rubin' has gained the Royal Horticultural Society's Award of Garden Merit.

References

superba
Plant nothospecies